Hughes-Cunningham House, also known as "HuCuRu," is a historic home located near Hedgesville, Berkeley County, West Virginia. The log and stone house is in two sections.  The main section was built in 1772 and is a two-story, three bay, gable roofed log building on a stone foundation. It measures 30 feet wide by 25 feet deep. A two bay, one story stone wing was added about 1784.

It was listed on the National Register of Historic Places in 1985. The house was heavily damaged in a fatal fire on August 27, 2017.

References

Houses completed in 1772
Houses in Berkeley County, West Virginia
Houses on the National Register of Historic Places in West Virginia
National Register of Historic Places in Berkeley County, West Virginia
Stone houses in West Virginia